Alus (born January 1, 1994) is an American singer, songwriter, musician, and producer. She gained popularity through her YouTube mash-ups and covers on her channel as an independent artist.

Early life
Alus was born January 1, 1994, in New Jersey. Her grandmother's music had been a childhood influence, who was a renowned musician in the Violinaires, a group of violinists that performs with Frank Sinatra's The Rat Pack. Alus at a very young age, started performing on stage in musicals. When she was eleven years old, she started her classical vocal training in opera from a Curtis Institute of Music instructor and also received formal classical piano lessons. She is also a self-taught guitarist.

She passed on a scholarship to Berklee College of Music to pursue her career full time after high-school.

Career
Alus's first release that gained traction was "Ordinary Girl". Released independently with much success on New York Radio, she gained the attention of music veterans Steve Rifkind and Russell Simmons. After teaming up with their Samsung sponsored label All Def Digital, Alus released the official music video that came out on the label's YouTube channel.

Alus records herself in her at home studio, releasing mash-ups and covers on her YouTube channel. She released them into monthly albums called the "Bedroom Covers" series. Her mashup video of Xxxtentacion’s "SAD!" and The Weeknd’s "Call Out My Name" received over 1 million views. Alus was reposted by Nicki Minaj twice on her Instagram page after gaining attention from her remix of "Megatron" and mashup of "No Frauds", "Changed It", and "Regret in Your Tears".

Alus sang the national anthem at Madison Square Garden on many occasions including for the televised sold-out Canelo vs. Rocky boxing match in 2018.

In 2020, Alus released a new song every week in a series entitled "52 Shades of Alus" amassing over one million plays across streaming platforms.

In June 2021, Alus released “Wig!” featuring Cakes da Killa with sampled vocals from Canada's Drag Race Lemon in honor of Pride Month. Paper Magazine premiered the music video release calling it “a perfect ‘feeling yourself’ bop.”

Personal life 
Alus is Puerto Rican on her mother’s side, and Russian and Austrian on her father’s. She is an advocate for animal rights, serving as an ambassador for the ASPCA.

Discography

Albums

Mixtape 
2014: Alus – Alustrious (Hosted By DJ Epps)

Single
 2015: Talk It
 2015: Good Over Here
 2016: Ordinary Girl
 2016: Naked Pic
 2017: This Is Halloween
 2017: Sbu
 2017: Aladdin
 2017: This Christmas
 2018: Ooh Papi
 2018: I
 2018: Snow Business
 2019: Girl Gang
 2019: Touch Me
 2019: fnsmyp
 2019: No Bra Club
 2019: Cherry
 2020: Better
 2020: Diamonds Dancing
 2020: Babe Ruthless
 2020: Legends Never Die
 2020: Saturn
 2020: Religion
 2020: Se7en
 2020: IOU
 2020: Agua
 2020: Get Money
 2020: Jackpot
 2020: Wash Your Hands
 2020: Rapunzel
 2020: Snap!
 2020: Phatty
 2020: Video Star
 2020: Exotic
 2020: Double Text
 2020: Reign
 2020: Scissors
 2020: Nbd
 2020: Distraction
 2020: Call Me By My Name
 2020: Bandera
 2020: Undecided
 2020: Colors
 2020: Crash Your Party
 2020: I Don't Need Anybody
 2020: Sola
 2020: The Big Bang!
 2020: One Thing
 2020: Somebody
 2020: Follow
 2020: Monster Truck
 2020: Outlaw
 2020: One in a Million
 2020: Attention!
 2020: No No
 2020: Say Less
 2020: No Angel
 2020: Adam & Evil
 2020: Wig!
 2020: Mood.
 2020: Girls
 2020: CEO
 2020: Freak
 2020: Tic Tac Toe
 2020: BLE$$ED
 2020: Abracadabra
 2020: Top
 2020: Different
 2020: Wishlist
 2020: Tattoo
 2020: Real Body
 2020: Sus
 2020: Jeans
 2021: Wig! (Remix) feat. Cakes da Killa
 2022: Money Dance

Album Tracks
 Bedroom Covers
 2018: All The Stars
 2018: '90's Mashup
 2018: God's Plan
 2018: Be Careful / Bartier Cardi
 2018: Mi Gente / Mayores
 2018: Sad! / Call Out My Name
 2018: Unforgettable/ Location
 2018: Crying In The Club / Despacito
 2018: Fall In Line / Queen
 2018: Havana / Strip That Down
 2018: I Like It
 2018: Rockstar / Young Dumb & Broke
 Bedroom Covers II
 2018: Lucid Dreams / Better Now
 2018: Wild Thoughts / Loyalty
 2018: Nice for What
 2018: OMG / Mask Off
 2018: Fake Love / Not Nice
 2018: She Loves Control / How Long
 2018: Butterfly Effect / Bodak Yellow / Bank Account
 2018: Psycho
 2018: All Mine / Yikes
 2018: One Kiss / No Tears Left to Cry
 2018: Don't Matter to Me / In My Feelings
 2018: God is a woman / Apeshit
 Bedroom Covers III
 2018: Wake Me Up / Hey Brother
 2018: Girls Like You / Summertime Magic
 2018: The Middle / Let Me Go
 2018: Finesse
 2018: Bad and Boujee / T-Shirt / Shining
 2018: Growing Pains / In My Blood
 2018: Sober / Tell Me You Love Me
 2018: Meant To Be / Mine
 2018: Se Preparó / La Modelo
 2018: Friends / Real Friends
 2018: No Brainer / Nonstop
 2018: Barbie Dreams / Majesty
 Bedroom Covers IV
 2018: Friends / There's Nothing Holdin' Me Back
 2018: Redbone / Slow Hands
 2018: No Frauds / Changed It / Regret In Your Tears
 2018: Downtown / Échame La Culpa
 2018: Boo'd Up / Love Lies
 2018: Wolves / What Lovers Do
 2018: Look What You Made Me Do / ...Ready For It?
 2018: Halloween Mashup
 2018: Promises / No Promises
 2018: Never Be The Same / Perfect
 2018: Eastside / Happier
 2018: Breathin / Ganja Burns
 Bedroom Covers V
 2018: That's What I Like / I'm the One
 2018: Too Good At Goodbyes / New Rules
 2018: Attention / One Last Time
 2018: Disney Mashup
 2018: End Game / Silence
 2018: Chained to the Rhythm / Chantaje
 2018: Fetish / Sorry Not Sorry
 2018: IDGAF / Bad At Love
 2018: Cold / Issues
 2018: Stay / It Ain't Me
 2018: Falling Down / Youngblood
 2018: My Favorite Part
 Bedroom Covers VI
 2018: Free Fallin'
 2018: The Cure / Bad Liar
 2018: Sledgehammer / Crazy In Love
 2018: Heathens
 2018: Down / Bom Bidi Bom
 2018: Cold Water / Closer
 2018: Mercy / Say You Won't Let Go
 2018: One Dance / Needed Me
 2018: No Stylist / SICKO MODE
 2018: Woman Like Me / Side To Side
 2018: MIA / Taki Taki
 2018: thank u, next / Irreplaceable
 Bedroom Covers VII
 2018: Without Me / Cry Me A River
 2018: Wake Up In The Sky / Money
 2018: Starboy
 2018: Shape of You / Paris
 2018: Perfect Illusion / Papa Don't Preach
 2018: In Common / Controlla
 2018: 24K Magic / Open
 2018: Better
 2018: Selena Mashup
 2018: Waves / One In A Million
 2018: Arms Around You / Sunflower
 2018: Good Form / MAMA / KIKA
 Bedroom Covers VIII
 2019: Bad Romance / Sweet but Psycho
 2019: Trip / Suga Suga
 2019: Imagine / Better
 2019: Nothing Breaks Like a Heart / lovely
 2019: Undecided / Rock The Boat
 2019: Wow. / Drip Too Hard / BAD!
 2019: Leave Me Alone / Leave (Get Out)
 2019: Dancing with a Stranger / I Wanna Dance With Somebody
 2019: LBD / Ooh Papi
 2019: 7 rings / ***Flawless
 Bedroom Covers IX
 2019: 365 / High Hopes
 2019: bury a friend / Toxic
 2019: Con Calma / Secreto
 2019: Please Me / Needy
 2019: Maroon 5 Mashup
 2019: Nights Like This / Expectations
 2019: break up with your girlfriend, I'm bored / Girlfriend
 2019: Lost in the Fire
 Bedroom Covers IX
 2019: wish you were gay (Remix)
 2019: i'm so tired... (Remix)
 2019: Talk (Remix)
 2019: I Can't Get Enough (Remix)
 2019: Sucker (Remix)
 2019: Robbery (Remix)
 2019: Sally Walker (Remix)
 2019: Thotiana (Remix)
 2019: Baby Shark (Remix)
 2019: My Bad (Remix)

References

1994 births
Living people
American women singer-songwriters
21st-century American women singers
21st-century American singers
Singer-songwriters from New Jersey
Music YouTubers
YouTubers from New Jersey